Lorne Campbell 'Bob' Abernethy (4 March 1900 – 1 May 1969) was an Australian rules footballer who played with Melbourne in the Victorian Football League (VFL).

Personal life
In March 1942, two and a half years after the outbreak of the Second World War, Abernethy enlisted in the Australian Army. Serving as a private, he was discharged on 1 October 1945.

Notes

External links
 		
 

1900 births
1969 deaths
Australian rules footballers from Victoria (Australia)
Melbourne Football Club players
Australian Army personnel of World War II
Australian Army soldiers
People from Shepparton
Military personnel from Victoria (Australia)